A distribution list is an application of email client programs that allows a user to maintain a list of email addresses and send messages to all of them at once. This can be referred to as an electronic mailshot. Sending mail using a distribution list differs from an electronic mailing list or the email option found in an Internet forum as it is usually for one-way traffic and not for coordinating a discussion. A distribution list is an email equivalent of a postal mailing list. Can also be called "Distro".

Email